Laax is a municipality in the Surselva Region in the Swiss canton of Graubünden.

History

Laax is first mentioned c. 1290–98 as Lags.

Geography

 
Of this area, 35.8% is used for agricultural purposes, while 30.6% is forested. Of the rest of the land, 3.6% is settled (buildings or roads) and the remainder (29.9%) is non-productive (rivers, glaciers or mountains).
Before 2017, the municipality was located in the Ilanz sub-district of the Surselva district, after 2017 it was part of the Surselva Region. The municipality of Laax stretches from the village itself, to Plaun and the Vorab, in the skiing area. This is all one valley and the river eventually flows to the Rhine river. It consists of the village of Laax and the hamlets of Salums, Cons, Laax Murschetg, and Laax Dorf. The ski-lifts are in Laax Murschetg.

A small lake, Laaxersee (Lag Grond), is located in the village.

The village has views of the Signina group to the south and the Flimserstein to the north. The main facilities in the village include a swimming pool, a small supermarket, a post office and several shops, including a bakery.

Demographics
, 16.8% of the population was made up of foreign nationals. Over the last 10 years the population has grown at a rate of 5.8%. Most of the population speaks German (50.3%), with Romansh being second most common (40.1%) and Portuguese being third ( 3.9%).

, the gender distribution of the population was 51.1% male and 48.9% female.  The age distribution, in Laax is; 102 children or 8.9% of the population are between 0 and 9 years old and 147 teenagers or 12.8% are between 10 and 19.  Of the adult population, 152 people or 13.2% of the population are between 20 and 29 years old.  212 people or 18.4% are between 30 and 39, 171 people or 14.9% are between 40 and 49, and 184 people or 16.0% are between 50 and 59.  The senior population distribution is 110 people or 9.6% of the population are between 60 and 69 years old, 49 people or 4.3% are between 70 and 79, there are 23 people or 2.0% who are between 80 and 89.

In the 2011 last federal election the most popular party was the CVP which received 26.9% of the vote.  The next three most popular parties were the SVP (24.5%), the BDP (18.3%), and the FDP (13.3%).

The entire Swiss population is generally well educated.  In Laax about 74.6% of the population (between age 25-64) have completed either non-mandatory upper secondary education or additional higher education (either university or a Fachhochschule).

Laax has an unemployment rate of 1.58%.  , there were 27 people employed in the primary economic sector and about 11 businesses involved in this sector.  61 people are employed in the secondary sector and there are 14 businesses in this sector.  521 people are employed in the tertiary sector, with 88 businesses in this sector.

Of the rest of the population,  there are 12 individuals (or about 1.04% of the population) who belong to the Orthodox Church. There are 18 (or about 1.57% of the population) who are Muslims. There are 7 individuals (or about 0.61% of the population) who belong to another church (not listed on the census), 70 (or about 6.09% of the population) belong to no church, are agnostic or atheist, and 15 individuals (or about 1.30% of the population) did not answer the question.

The historical population is given in the following table:

In popular culture
In 2004 the resort was featured in the popular Xbox snowboarding video game which sold more than one million copies, Amped 2, and then in 2005 in the sequel Amped 3 on the Xbox 360.

In fiction
The chapters No Rainbow and The Legend of The Fall in the English language novel Angel by Sebastian Michael are almost entirely set in Laax. (Optimist Books, 2009)  (Hardback)  (Paperback)

References

External links

 
Official Tourism website

Photos of Laax

 
Ski areas and resorts in Switzerland